Ozarenny is a rural locality (a settlement) in Pochepsky District, Bryansk Oblast, Russia. The population was 641 as of 2010. There are 6 streets.

Geography 
Ozarenny is located 21 km east of Pochep (the district's administrative centre) by road. Krasny Rog is the nearest rural locality.

References 

Rural localities in Pochepsky District